Bowser is a surname. It is of Norman origin and was given to a person who frequently used the informal Norman greeting beu sire, which means "good sir", or "fine sir". It is also associated with the Super Mario character Bowser. Notable people with the surname include:

Arda Bowser (1899–1996), professional football player
Charley Bowser (1898–1989), American football coach
Doug Bowser, President of Nintendo of America
John Bowser (1856–1936), Australian politician
 George Bowser, Canadian comedian, of  Bowser and Blue duo
John W. Bowser (1892–1956), Canadian who supervised construction of the Empire State Building
Jonathon Earl Bowser, Canadian artist and illustrator of Zabibah and the King
Mary Bowser, American freed slave who worked as a Union spy during the American Civil War
Muriel Bowser, Current Democratic mayor of Washington, D.C.
Ryan Bowser, music producer
Sylvanus Bowser (1854–1938), American inventor
Tyus Bowser (born 1995), American football player for the Baltimore Ravens
William John Bowser (1867–1933), Canadian politician 
Yvette Lee Bowser, American television writer and producer.

See also
 Beausire

References

Surnames of Norman origin
English-language surnames